Aníbal Ostoa Ortega (born 10 May 1949) is a Mexican politician currently affiliated with National Regeneration Movement and serving as a senator in the LXIV Legislature of the Mexican Congress from the state of Campeche. In 2009 he served as a federal deputy in the final six months of the LX Legislature of the Mexican Congress representing Campeche, taking the place of Deputy Layda Elena Sansores San Román.

References

1949 births
Living people
Politicians from Campeche
Members of the Chamber of Deputies (Mexico)
Citizens' Movement (Mexico) politicians
21st-century Mexican politicians
Morena (political party) politicians
National Autonomous University of Mexico alumni
Members of the Congress of Campeche
Members of the Senate of the Republic (Mexico) for Campeche
Senators of the LXIV and LXV Legislatures of Mexico